In actuarial science, the Esscher transform  is a transform that takes a probability density f(x) and transforms it to a new probability density f(x; h) with a parameter h. It was introduced by F. Esscher in 1932 .

Definition

Let f(x) be a probability density. Its Esscher transform is defined as

More generally, if μ is a probability measure, the Esscher transform of μ is a new probability measure Eh(μ) which has density

with respect to μ.

Basic properties 

 Combination

 The Esscher transform of an Esscher transform is again an Esscher transform: Eh1 Eh2 = Eh1 + h2.

 Inverse

 The inverse of the Esscher transform is the Esscher transform with negative parameter: E = E−h

 Mean move

 The effect of the Esscher transform on the normal distribution is moving the mean:

Examples

See also
 Esscher principle
 Exponential tilting

References 
 

 

Actuarial science
Transforms